Intersections is the second studio album by the Chicago-based singer-songwriter Evan Thomas Weiss, known as Into It. Over It. Rolling Stone listed the album 38th on the "40 Greatest Emo Albums of All-time" list.

Critical reception
The Chicago Reader called the album "lush and lovely," writing that Weiss "keeps finding new ways to express himself within an idiom that’s already been declared dead several times."

Track listing

Personnel
Into It. Over It.
Evan Thomas Weiss – vocals, guitar, bass, other instruments

Additional personnel
Nick Wakim – Drums

References

2013 albums
Into It. Over It. albums
Triple Crown Records albums
Big Scary Monsters Recording Company albums